A by-election was held for the Victorian Legislative Assembly seat of Altona on 13 February 2010, following the sudden resignation of state Transport Minister Lynne Kosky on 18 January, who cited a family member's health as the reason for her decision to leave politics. Altona is widely considered a safe Labor seat, Kosky won over 60% of the primary vote at the 2006 state election.

The Labor Party's Jill Hennessy, a lawyer who sits on the board of Western Health, won the seat despite a 13 percent swing away from Labor. The Liberals and Greens went up by 11 percent and 2 percent respectively. Hennessy retained the seat in the November 2010 state election.

Candidates

The following candidates nominated; they are listed in ballot-paper order.

Independent – Brijender Nain.
Independent – Liz Mumby.
Socialist Alliance – Margarita Windisch.
Liberal Party – Mark Rose, a Wyndham councillor and candidate for Tarneit in the 2006 state election.
Greens – David Strangward, a management consultant.
Independent – Andrew Rixon.
Independent – Brian Shaw.
Labor Party – Jill Hennessy, a lawyer who sat on the board of Western Health, and was backed in her preselection bid by Steve Bracks, Joan Kirner, Lynne Kosky and Nicola Roxon. She defeated Hobsons Bay councillor Luba Grigorovitch for Labor endorsement.

Election results

References

External links
2010 Altona by-election: The Poll Bludger

Victorian state by-elections
2010 elections in Australia
2010s in Victoria (Australia)